John William Veitch Shepherd (1894–1936) was an English professional footballer who played as a goalkeeper in the Football League for Ashington and Luton Town.

Personal life 
Shepherd served in the British Army during the First World War.

Career statistics

References 

English Football League players
Place of death missing
British Army personnel of World War I
English footballers
Newcastle United F.C. wartime guest players
1894 births
1936 deaths
Footballers from South Shields
Association football goalkeepers
Jarrow F.C. players
Ashington A.F.C. players
Luton Town F.C. players
Workington A.F.C. players
West Stanley F.C. players